Memoricide is the destruction of the memory, extermination of the past of targeted people. It also refers to destruction of the traces (such as religious buildings or schools) that might recall the former presence of those considered undesirable. 

Memoricide is used in support of ethnic cleansing. Since memoricide refers to intentional attempts to erase human memory about something, it usually takes the form of destruction of physical property. The term was coined by Croatian doctor Mirko Grmek in a text published in Le Figaro on 19 December 1991.

Allegations of memoricide 

According to some accounts memoricide was employed by Greece toward Macedonians of Slavic origin.

The dissident historian Ilan Pappe deployed the concept of cultural memoricide as systematic attempt of post-1948 Israel in relation to Palestine. 

Grmek used the term to describe activities of the rebel Serb forces in Croatia during the first year of the Croatian independence war.

See also

 Cultural genocide

References

Sources 

 
 
 
 
 
 
 
 

1990s neologisms